The Liga de Voleibol Superior Femenino (LVSF) is a professional volleyball league in Puerto Rico. The competitions are organized by the Puerto Rican Volleyball Federation (Federación Puertorriqueña de Voleibol, FPV).

Current teams

League champions

External links
 Puerto Rican Volleyball Federation official website
  Puerto Rican League. women.volleybox.net 

LVSF
Puerto Rico
Puerto Rico
Women's sports leagues in Puerto Rico
Professional sports leagues in the United States
Professional sports leagues in Puerto Rico
1968 establishments in Puerto Rico
Sports leagues established in 1968